Solo Piano is an album by pianist Jaki Byard recorded in 1969 and released on the Prestige label.

Reception

Allmusic awarded the album 4 stars with its review by Ken Dryden stating, "Jaki Byard is always an enjoyable pianist in any group, but he is at his best as a soloist. His second solo outing has a good deal of New Orleans influences".

Track listing 
All compositions by Jaki Byard except as indicated
 "New Orleans Strut" - 5:56 
 "Spanish Tinge No. 2" - 5:26
 "Top of the Gate Rag" - 3:08 
 "A Basin Street Ballad" - 4:04
 "The Hollis Stomp" - 2:27
 "Hello, Young Lovers" (Oscar Hammerstein II, Richard Rodgers) - 4:45   
 "Seasons" - 3:46 
 "Medley: I Know a Place / Let the Good Times Roll" (Tony Hatch / Shirley Goodman, Leonard Lee) - 3:33  
 "Do You Know What It Means to Miss New Orleans?"  (Louis Alter, Eddie DeLange) - 4:59

Personnel 
Jaki Byard - piano

References 

Jaki Byard albums
1969 albums
Prestige Records albums
Albums produced by Don Schlitten
Instrumental albums
Solo piano jazz albums